Alkalai may refer to:

 Judah Alkalai (1798–1878), Ottoman Jewish religious leader & activist
 Mosko Alkalai (1931–2008), Israeli actor

Alkalay 
 Karen Alkalay-Gut (born 1945), an Israeli poet, professor, and editor

Alcalay 
 Ammiel Alcalay (born 1956, Boston), an American poet, scholar, critic, translator, and prose stylist
 Luna Alcalay (1928–2012, Zagreb), a Croatian-Austrian pianist, music educator and composer

See also 
 Alkali, alkaline substance